Cnodalon is a genus of darkling beetles in the family Tenebrionidae.

Species
Species within this genus include:
 Cnodalon angulicollis
 Cnodalon batesi
 Cnodalon boliviense
 Cnodalon obscurum
 Cnodalon pascoei
 Cnodalon rufipes
 Cnodalon viride

References

External links

Tenebrionidae genera